Louise O'Hara is a camogie player, winner of an All Star award in 2006. She was nominated for further All Star awards in 2004, 2005 and 2009.

References

Living people
Dublin camogie players
Year of birth missing (living people)